The Australian Science Media Centre (AusSMC) is an independent, not-for-profit service for the news media, giving journalists direct access to evidence-based science and expertise.

The Centre's aim is to better inform public debate on the major issues of the day by improving links between local and international media and the Australian scientific community. The Centre operates a database of scientists who are willing to engage with the media. It is located at The Science Exchange in Adelaide, which it shares with the Royal Institution of Australia (RiAus). The AusSMC collects rapid round-ups of expert opinion and comments from scientists in reaction to breaking news and also runs national media briefings for journalists in cities around Australia. Media briefings are also streamed live over the internet to journalists. Journalists are able to register with the AusSMC to receive media alerts and rapid roundups by email. The Centre also collaborates with media officers and scientists.

The AusSMC operates with five full-time and three part-time staff and is headed by CEO Dr Susannah Eliott. Peter Yates AM is its inaugural Chairman.

South Australian Premier Mike Rann established the centre following a recommendation from Adelaide Thinker in Residence, Baroness Susan Greenfield. Rann later reflected on the importance of establishing the centre during his Investigator Lecture at Flinders University in October 2011. At the time, the centre was approaching six full years of operation.

Governance 
The AusSMC is governed by a board of management. The centre's "Statement of Independence" includes the following passage:"All board members acknowledge that Centre staff are free to disseminate the best available scientific information, regardless of any commercial, political or personal interests, including those of any sponsors or board members. Full editorial control of all material disseminated by the SMC rests with the staff of the SMC, with guidance sought from the Centre’s Science Advisory Panel (SAP) when required."

Sponsors 
The AusSMC receives funding from sponsors. Each sponsor's contribution is capped at 10% of the centre's operating costs. Foundation partners are: ABC, Australia-Pacific LNG, CSIRO, Fairfax media, Government of South Australia, isentia, News Corp Australia, NSW Government, RiAus, University of Melbourne, University of New South Wales, Government of Victoria, Flinders University, Inspiring Australia, CSL, AIA, Orica, Squiz, University of Queensland, University of Technology Sydney (UTS) and Curtin University. The centre acknowledges the Government of South Australia for significant support of the AusSMC's development, including providing financial support for infrastructure set-up costs and in kind assistance.

Other SMCs
Science Media Centres exist in other countries; Canada, UK, New Zealand, and Japan. These centres are independent of each other, but cooperate regularly.

External links
The Australian Science Media Centre (AusSMC)

References 

Organisations based in Adelaide
A